Robert Kissam Maloney (1856 – May 31, 1908), was a professional baseball player who played as a center fielder for three games over two seasons in Major League Baseball.

References

External links

http://www.baseball-almanac.com/players/player.php?p=malonjo01

New York Mutuals players
Hartford Dark Blues players
Major League Baseball center fielders
19th-century baseball players
Memphis Reds (League Alliance) players
1856 births
Date of birth unknown
1908 deaths
Burials at Calvary Cemetery (Queens)